{{DISPLAYTITLE:Omicron2 Orionis}}

Omicron2 Orionis (ο2 Ori) is a solitary star in the constellation Orion. It has an apparent visual magnitude of 4.06, which is bright enough to be seen with the naked eye. Based upon an annual parallax shift of 17.54 mas, it is around 186 light years from the Sun. At that distance, the visual magnitude of the star is diminished by an interstellar absorption factor of 0.09 due to intervening dust.

This is a red clump giant star with a stellar classification of K2 IIIb. It is around 5.4 billion years old with a projected rotational velocity that is too small to be measured. The star has expanded to about 15 times the radius of the Sun and shines with 79 times the solar luminosity from its outer atmosphere at an effective temperature of 4,498 K. Omicron2 Orionis is most likely a member of the Milky Way's thin disk population.

References

K-type giants
Horizontal-branch stars
Orion (constellation)
Orionis, Omicron2
Durchmusterung objects
Orionis, 09
031421
022957
01580